The Leicestershire and Northamptonshire Union Canal is a canal in England that is now part of the Grand Union Canal.
It was authorised by an Act of Parliament in 1793 to connect Leicester to the Nene near Northampton and to join the projected line of the Grand Junction Canal but by 1809 the canal was only complete from Leicester to Market Harborough. In 1810 the connection was completed by the original Grand Union Canal Company which had been formed to make a connection between the canal at Foxton and the Grand Junction canal at Norton Junction. The company was eventually bought by the Grand Junction Canal company in 1894.

Notes

See also

Grand Union Canal (old)
Canals of Great Britain
History of the British canal system
Waterscape

Canals in England
Canals in Northamptonshire
Canals opened in 1810